The Institute of Refrigeration is an organisation in the UK that supports the refrigeration and air-conditioning industry.

History
The Institute was formed in 1899 as the Cold Storage and Ice Association, the first national society in the world for the refrigeration industry. The Institute's first president was Alan Egerton, 3rd Baron Egerton. It became the IOR in 1944 when professional membership was introduced.  In 2010 the Institute launched a short video explaining the opportunities for careers in the refrigeration industry under the title  Careers in Cooling.  This uses interviews with a wide range of young people working in different aspects of refrigeration and air-conditioning to explain what a rewarding career it can be.  A webpage was also set up to support the video.

Structure
The Institute of Refrigeration is governed by a Board of Trustees which comprises the President, the President-Elect, the Immediate Past-President, the Honorary Treasurer and six elected members.

The current council comprises

 President - Graeme Fox, FInstR
 Immediate Past-President - Mike Creamer, FInstR
 President Elect - 
 Hon Treasurer - Nick Rivers, FInstR
 Elected Members - Lisa-Jayne Cook, MInstR, Juliet Loiselle, MInstR, John Skelton, FInstR, John Ellis, FInstR, Catarina Marques, MInstR, Ian Fisher, FInstR
The work of the Institute is carried out by committees, including

 Membership Committee - chair Dr Rob Lamb
 Technical Committee - chair David Paget
 Papers and Publications Committee - chair Colin Vines
 International Refrigeration Committee - chair Dr Andy Pearson
 Service Engineers Section - chair David Sowden
 Sustainable Innovation in Refrigeration and Air Conditioning - chair Prof Graeme Maidment
 Annual Dinner Steering Committee - chair Paul Arrowsmith
 Education Committee - chair John Skelton
 Women in RACHP Network -  Chair Samantha Buckell

Branches
It has branches covering:
 East Anglia
 Northern
 Scotland
and co-operates with independent refrigeration societies in Hampshire, Birmingham and London as well as international organisations Irish Institute of Refrigeration, ASHRAE, ISHRAE, PHVAR

Purpose
The purpose of the Institute of Refrigeration is outlined in the Institute's constitution as follows:

a)	The general advancement of refrigeration in all its applications, in relation both to the perfection of its methods, and to the extension of its services to the community.

b)	To promote means for communication between members and their interchange of views.

c)	To encourage invention and research in all matters relating to the science and practice of refrigeration.

d)	To promote a sustainable approach to all aspects of refrigeration system design and operation

e)	To co-operate with educational institutions for the furtherance of education in the science and practice of refrigeration.

f)	To hold meetings of the Institute for reading and discussing papers dealing with refrigeration and allied subjects.

g)	To publish and distribute the proceedings or reports of the Institute.

h)	To do all other things, incidental or conducive to the attainment of the above objects or any of them.

It is a registered Charitably Incorporated Organisation (not-for-profit) comprising nearly 2500 individual members. The IOR runs international conferences and events based in the UK on technical topics of general interest to the refrigeration, air conditioning and heat pump industry. The IOR publishes an annual set of Technical Proceedings as well as Safety Alerts, Guidance Notes and Good Practice Guides for Technicians and a set of Codes of Practice for different refrigerant groups. It also offers e-learning on alternative refrigerants and a programme of accessible webinars.  The IOR ran a well publicised campaign called REAL Zero which had a significant impact on improving refrigerant containment, and was turned into an e-learning programme at www.realzero.org.uk.

Membership
There are five main grades of membership; Associate, Technician, Member, Fellow and Student/Young Persons.  Membership grade is based on relevant experience and responsibilities gained over time in the industry and is determined by application to the membership committee. Affiliate Membership is offered to individuals without suitable experience. The Institute is a professional affiliate of the UK Engineering Council and has many overseas members.  It has formal agreements to share information and co-operate with ASHRAE (USA), ISHRAE (India), PHVAR (Pakistan) and AIRAH (Australia).

See also
 British Frozen Food Federation
 Air Conditioning, Heating and Refrigeration Institute
 Federation of Environmental Trade Associations
 American Society of Heating, Refrigerating and Air-Conditioning Engineers (ASHRAE)
 Chiller
 Psychrometrics

References

External links
 IOR
 
 Real Zero (made in collaboration with The Carbon Trust)
 Institute of Refrigeration Ireland - separate organisation
 Real Alternatives

Trade associations based in the United Kingdom
Organizations established in 1899
Engineering societies based in the United Kingdom
Organisations based in the London Borough of Sutton
Heating, ventilation, and air conditioning
Food preservation